Ashoknagar tehsil is a fourth-order administrative and revenue division, a subdivision of third-order administrative and revenue division of Ashoknagar district of Madhya Pradesh.

Geography
Ashoknagar tehsil has an area of 1237.82 sq kilometers. It is bounded by Shadhora tehsil in the northwest, Isagarh tehsil in the north, Chanderi tehsil  in the northeast, Mungaoli tehsil in the east and southeast, Vidisha district in the south and Guna district in the southwest and west.

See also 
Ashoknagar district

Citations

External links

Tehsils of Madhya Pradesh
Ashoknagar district